The Pretender is the fourth album by the American singer-songwriter Jackson Browne, released in 1976. It peaked at No. 5 on Billboard's album chart. The singles from the album were "Here Come Those Tears Again", which reached No. 23, and "The Pretender", which peaked at No. 58.

History
The Pretender was released after the suicide of Browne's first wife, Phyllis Major, and one of the album's songs "Here Come Those Tears Again" (co-written by Major's mother Nancy Farnsworth) is dedicated to her. The album has production by Jon Landau and a mixture of styles.

The title track was used in the 1995 film Mr. Holland's Opus.

The album was certified as a gold record in 1976 and platinum in 1977 by the RIAA. It reached multi-platinum in 1997 and 2006.

The back cover of The Pretender shows Pablo Neruda's poem Brown and Agile Child, translated by Kenneth Rexroth, in its entirety.

Reception

The Pretender was nominated for a Grammy Award in 1978, but did not win.

Record World said that "Browne's tender concerns are as insightfully expressed as has become the norm, Jon Landau's production adding a subtle broadening of the rock base" and said that "'The Fuse,' 'The Pretender,' 'Sleep's Dark and Silent Gate' and 'The Only Child' are particularly moving and beautifully arranged."

In his review for AllMusic, William Ruhlmann was equivocal about the album, stating Browne "took a step back from the precipice so well defined on his first three albums, but doing so didn't seem to make him feel any better... The man who had delved so deeply into life's abyss on his earlier albums was in search of escape this time around."

In The Rolling Stone Album Guide, Marc Coleman wrote, "...even when his songwriting is sharp, the mellowing trend in his music dulls the impact. Browne eerily predicts the rise of the yuppie on The Pretenders title track, only to have his point undercut by a creeping string section." Music critic Robert Christgau gave the album a B grade, but explained, "This is an impressive record, but a lot of the time I hate it; my grade is an average, not a judgment" and "The shallowness of his kitschy doomsaying and sentimental sexism is well-known, but I'm disappointed as well in his depth of craft." In 2012, the album was ranked number 391 on Rolling Stone magazine's list of The 500 Greatest Albums of All Time. The Rolling Stone Encyclopedia of Rock & Roll says, "Its sense of despair is derived in part from the suicide of his first wife, Phyllis, in 1976, two and a half years after the birth of their son, Ethan." The single "Here Come Those Tears Again" was credited as co-written with Nancy Farnsworth, Phyllis Major's mother.

Track listing
All tracks are written by Jackson Browne except where noted.

Side 1
"The Fuse" – 5:50
"Your Bright Baby Blues" – 6:05
"Linda Paloma" – 4:06
"Here Come Those Tears Again" (Browne, Nancy Farnsworth) – 3:37

Side 2
"The Only Child" – 3:43
"Daddy's Tune" – 3:35
"Sleep's Dark and Silent Gate" – 2:37
"The Pretender" – 5:53

Personnel 
 Jackson Browne – vocals, acoustic guitar (1, 2)
 Leland Sklar – bass (1, 6, 7, 8)
 Chuck Rainey – bass (2, 5)
 Russ Kunkel – drums (1)
 Jim Gordon – drums (2, 4)
 Jeff Porcaro – drums (5–8)
 Craig Doerge – acoustic piano (1, 6, 7, 8)
 Roy Bittan – acoustic piano (2)
 Bill Payne – Hammond organ (2), acoustic piano (4, 5)
 David Lindley – slide guitar (1, 6), violin (5)
 Lowell George – slide guitar (2), harmony vocals (2)
 Arthur Gerst – harp (3), backing vocals (3), musical arrangements (3)
 Roberto Gutierrez – guitarrón (3), violin (3), backing vocals (3)
 Luis Damian – acoustic guitar (3), backing vocals (3)
 Michael Utley – Hammond organ (4)
 John Hall – guitar solo (4)
 Fred Tackett – acoustic guitar (4, 5, 7, 8), electric guitar (4, 7, 8), guitar left (6)
 Bob Glaub – bass (4)
 Albert Lee – electric guitar (5)
 Gary Coleman – percussion (5)
 Waddy Wachtel – guitar right (6) 
 Jim Horn – saxophone (6), horn arrangements (6)
 Quitman Dennis – saxophone (6)
 Dick Hyde – trombone (6)
 Chuck Findley – trumpet (6)
 David Campbell – string arrangements (7, 8)
harmony vocals:
 Rosemary Butler (4), Bonnie Raitt (4)
 Don Henley (5), J. D. Souther (5)
 David Crosby (8), Graham Nash (8)

Production 
 Producer – Jon Landau
 Engineers – John Haeny (Tracks 1, 2 & 4–8); Greg Ladanyi (Track 3).
 Additional recording – Mark Howlett
 Assistant recording – Paul Black
 Mixing – Greg Ladanyi (Tracks 1–6 & 8); Val Garay (Track 7).
 Mix assistant – Dennis Kirk (Tracks 1–6 & 8)
 Mixed at The Sound Factory (Hollywood, CA).
 Mastered by Bernie Grundman at A&M Mastering Studios (Los Angeles, CA).
 Management – Mark Hammerman
 Art direction and design – Gary Burden
 Back cover photo – Jackson Browne
 Front cover photo – Tom Kelley
 Other photography – Howard Burke, Peter Golden and Tony Lane.
 Liner notes – Pablo Neruda and Kenneth Rexroth

Charts
Album – Billboard (United States)

Singles – Billboard (United States)

Certifications

References

External links
Album online on Radio3Net a radio channel of Romanian Radio Broadcasting Company

Jackson Browne albums
1976 albums
Asylum Records albums
Albums arranged by David Campbell (composer)
Albums produced by Jon Landau
Albums recorded at Sunset Sound Recorders